The Kurdistan leaf-toed gecko (Asaccus kurdistanensis) is a species of lizard belonging to the gecko family Phyllodactylidae. A. kurdistanensis is native to the Kurdistan province in western Iran and was described in 2006.

References 

Asaccus
Geckos of Iran
Endemic fauna of Iran
Reptiles described in 2006